Michael Lawrence Haider (October 1, 1904 - August 14, 1986) was a noted American petroleum engineer, business executive, and a founder of the National Academy of Engineering. He was chairman of Exxon Corporation from 1965-1969.

Life and career
Haider was born on a wheat farm in Mandan, North Dakota, moved to California as a teenager, and in 1927 received his B.A. in chemistry from Stanford University. In 1929 he started his career in Tulsa, Oklahoma, as a chemical engineer with Carter Oil (an affiliate of Standard Oil of New Jersey, later Exxon). One early assignment was to check the quality of helium for dirigibles. He became chief petroleum engineer and then managed all engineering for Carter. In 1938 he moved to New York as manager of Exxon's production engineering and research, and in 1945 became executive assistant in the Producing Department.

In 1946 Haider moved to Toronto, where in 1947 as manager of the Producing and Exploration Department of Imperial Oil, Limited, a Canadian affiliate, he obtained the Leduc oil field that made western Canada a net oil exporter. He was subsequently elected a director of Imperial (1948) and vice president (1950). In 1952 Haider returned to New York where he served for two years as deputy coordinator of worldwide production. He then became president and a director of International Petroleum Company, Limited, responsible for parts of South America.

In 1959 he was elected an Exxon director, then vice president and director for Latin America (1960), and executive vice-president and member of the Executive Committee (1961). In 1963 he was elected president and vice chairman of the Executive Committee, and in 1965 he became chairman of the board and chief executive officer until his retirement in 1969.

Haider served as chairman of the American Petroleum Institute and president of the American Institute of Mining, Metallurgical, and Petroleum Engineers (1952). He was director of First National City Bank and the Economic Development Council of New York City, trustee of the Committee for Economic Development, and member of the Council on Foreign Relations, the National Petroleum Council, and The Business Council. He was a chairman of the Radio Free Europe and Metropolitan Opera board member. He was elected to Spain's Instituto de Cultura Hispánica (1962) and was awarded its Gran Cruz de la Order del Merito Civil in 1969, in which year he also received Italy's Cavaliere di Gran Croce.  It was the year 1969 that Haider was also awarded the John Fritz Medal.  In 1970 he was awarded the Charles Frederic Rand Memorial Gold Medal, bestowed by the American Institute of Mining, Metallurgical, and Petroleum Engineers.

References 

 National Academy of Engineering memorial tribute
 Time Magazine article, Dec. 29, 1967

20th-century American engineers
Founding members of the United States National Academy of Engineering
People from Mandan, North Dakota
1986 deaths
1904 births